Oniore Waterfall and Toba First Cave Natural Monuments is a combination of waterfall and cave at 680 m above sea level in Martvili Municipality, Samegrelo-Zemo Svaneti region of Georgia.

The cave is produced in the limestone.  The excavation measured 12m X 5 m is opened along the shaft.  The underground waterfall is about 70 m from the cave entrance, where the height of the ceiling is 30 meters.  The width of the tunnel is 12-15 m.  The waterfall is about 67 m high.

See also 
Toba Waterfall and Arsen Okrojanashvili Cave Natural Monument

References

Natural monuments of Georgia (country)
Waterfalls of Georgia (country)
Geography of Samegrelo-Zemo Svaneti
Caves of Georgia (country)